Paramotoring at the 2012 Asian Beach Games was held from 17 June to 21 June 2012 in Fengxiang Beach, Haiyang, China.

Medalists

Medal table

Results

Individual economy
18–20 June

Individual precision
17–21 June

 Sheng Guangqiang was awarded bronze because of no three-medal sweep per country rule.

Individual combined
17–21 June

Team combined
17–21 June

References 

Official website

2012 Asian Beach Games events
2012
2012 in air sports